Sirama is a municipality  in Madagascar. It belongs to the district of Ambilobe, which is a part of Diana Region.

The municipality was named after the sugar factory with the same name: Sirama that has its seat in the town.

References 

Populated places in Diana Region